Gullipilli Sowria Raj v. Bandaru Pavani is an Indian Supreme Court ruling in a lawsuit involving the legality of the marriage to a Hindu woman of a Christian man, Raj, who had represented himself as Hindu. The court ruled that the marriage was not valid.

Facts
Early in December 2008, a Christian, had misled her by pretending to be a Hindu, and tried to blackmail her parents for money or any other asserts in the form of gold. He locked her in a room and didn't allow her to talk to her parents. He took some pictures and asked for more money.
Section 5 of the Act makes it clear that it may be solemnized between any two people if the conditions (such as age eligibility) contained in the said section were fulfilled.  In other words, in the even said conditions are not met.

Court
Allegedly, Raj had misinformed everyone about his social status and she filed a case.

The High Court upheld her plea and said the marriage was void as the Act postulated only between Hindus; following this, Raj, filed a special leave petition (SLP) in the apex court. He claimed that the Hindu Act does not preclude a Hindu from marrying a person of another faith.

However counsel argued that each religious community has its own form which excludes members of other communities. Christian and a non-Christian can marry, but only under the provisions.
Dismissing the Christian appeal, the apex court upheld the High Court’s view that the not valid under the, specifically pointing to the fact that Section 5 of the Act makes it clear that may be solemnized between any two Hindus only if the conditions in the said Section were fulfilled.

References 
http://www.in./news/r3344eadnews-current-affairs-hinduchristian-marriage-invalid-under-hindu-act-sc-7103313-41545-1.html
http://www..com/2008/12/556607/stories/200812076014491100.htm 
http://www.telegraphin.com/105567781208/jsp/nation/story_1024420462.jsp
http://www.lawyersclub.com/forum/message_display.4455asp?group_id=355584 

Hindu law
2008 in case law
2008 in India
Indian family law